Kaumahina State Wayside Park or Kaumahina State Park, is located in Maui County, Hawaii,  East of Kahului and  West of Hana along the Hana Highway. Amenities include a rest stop and scenic views of the northeast Maui coastline and Ke'anae Peninsula.

See also
List of Hawaii state parks

References

Protected areas of Maui
State parks of Hawaii